Monte M. Moore (1971) is an American illustrator, screenwriter, and designer focusing on the comics, gaming and entertainment industries.

Education
Monte Moore was born in Phoenix, Arizona in 1971. He graduated from Colorado State University in 1993 with a BFA in Graphic Design/Illustration and was awarded outstanding Senior Portfolio in the State of Colorado from the Art Director's Club of Denver.

Monte Moore has attended multiple master's workshops held by noted artists such as Morton Solberg

Career
Moore has been involved in comics, gaming, pin-up and entertainment illustration for almost 30 years.

His work has been commissioned and licensed by top-tier companies such as Lucasfilm Ltd, Disney, The U.S. Marine Corps, Paramount, Topps,  Harley-Davidson and most publishers in the comics industry including DC Comics, Image Comics, Harris Comics, IDW Publishing and many others.  Licensed work for Marvel started in 1998 on the Marvel Masterpieces card series through Rittenhouse Archives and continued on other sets including the recent Dangerous Diva’s set.  Later work in the early 2000s included work for Upper Deck on the VS. card game and dozens of other card games as well as work on Magic: The Gathering for Wizards of the Coast.  Monte’s work has been showcased in top industry publications such as several volumes of Spectrum: The Best in Contemporary Fantastic Art and in 1998 and 2001 Monte took the top awards at the World Fantasy Art Show against many of the world’s top illustrators. Along with having 7 art books being published Internationally, Monte has been Guest of Honor artist at the top conventions around the world including San Diego Comic-Con International in 2003,  Lucca Comics and Games in Italy in 2006 and 2008, FACTS Con in Belgium in 2014 and New York Comic-Con several times over the years.  Many publications outside the comics industry have also included Monte’s client artwork in their advertisements and those include Time, Newsweek, U.S. World Report and the Robb Report.  Monte keeps his hands in many different projects, which have included writing 10 screenplays, having 2 feature films produced, Art Director on other films (see IMDB), co-owning a successful traditional game company with several games on the market, and designer of over 80 fantasy themed sculptures in distribution around the world.

His Dungeons & Dragons work includes interior art for the third edition Monster Manual (2000), Monsters of Faerûn (2001), the third edition Manual of the Planes (2001), the 3.5 Monster Manual (2003), Expanded Psionics Handbook (2004), Complete Arcane (2004), Races of Destiny (2004), Complete Adventurer (2005), and Anauroch: The Empire of Shade (2007).

He is known for his work on the Magic: The Gathering collectible card game.

Monte's fantasy artwork has been featured in Heavy Metal Magazine

Moore has won the Best Artwork Category at the Dave Perewitz Custom paint Show at the Sturgis Bike Rally in 2008.

Monte is responsible for many of the Lady Death variant covers from Coffin Comics.

Monte Michael Moore was a variant cover artist for the TMNT #100 issue.

References

External links

 Monte Moore's website

https://www.youtube.com/watch?v=ZFyxt27i8XM
http://magiccards.info/query?q=a:%22monte+michael+moore%22&v=card&s=cname
http://www.isolaillyon.it/2016/09/16/gli-artisti-di-lucca-2016-monte-michael-moore.html
http://www.gonews.it/2017/04/19/empoli-si-prepara-al-ludicomix-torna-la-lego-in-piazza-gramsci-il-mariambini-diventera-il-fantasy-park/
https://www.locusmag.com/2008/2008Conventions.html
http://facts.be/nl/guest-archive/monte-m-moore-2/
https://www.locusmag.com/2008/2008Conventions.html
https://www.escapecollectibles.com/legendary-signed-print-moore/
http://www.glasshousegraphics.com/index.php/monte-moore
http://groovey.tv/monte-michael-moore-interview/
http://www.barnettharley.com/barnettsmagazine/page-118
http://www.heavymetalmagazinefanpage.com/hmlist08.html
https://www.pinterest.com/pin/456763587183185435/
https://comicvine.gamespot.com/monte-m-moore/4040-49756/issues-cover/
https://www.pinterest.com/pin/456763587183185435/

1971 births
Artists from Phoenix, Arizona
Colorado State University alumni
Fantasy artists
Living people
Role-playing game artists